Wilfred Bernard Gillow (8 July 1892 – 11 March 1944) was an English professional association football player and manager. Gillow also played cricket at county level.

Football career
Gillow played club football for Blackpool, Preston North End, Fleetwood and Grimsby Town.

Gillow began his coaching career as player-manager at Grimsby Town, and was in charge from 1924 to 1932. He also managed Middlesbrough from March 1934 until his death in March 1944, which came after a "serious" operation.

Cricket career
Gillow played club cricket for Cleethorpes, and represented Lincolnshire in 1926.

Managerial statistics

References

1892 births
1944 deaths
English footballers
English football managers
Blackpool F.C. players
Preston North End F.C. players
Fleetwood Town F.C. players
Grimsby Town F.C. players
English Football League players
Grimsby Town F.C. managers
Middlesbrough F.C. managers
English Football League managers
Association footballers not categorized by position